The Antonov An-148 is a regional jet designed and built by Antonov of Ukraine. Development of the aircraft was started in the 1990s, and its maiden flight took place on 17 December 2004. The aircraft completed its certification programme on 26 February 2007.
The Antonov An-158 is a stretched fuselage version of the aircraft, accommodating up to 100 passengers.

Following a crash in February 2018, all An-148 and An-158 in Russia were grounded by the Russian Ministry of Transport. In addition, Cubana grounded its An-158 fleet as of May 2018 due to several technical issues with the aircraft. Until late 2018, the Antonov An-148 aircraft was also being produced in Russia by Voronezh Aircraft Production Association; however, due to the souring political relationship between Ukraine and Russia, production in Russia was discontinued. The last Russian-built An-148 was completed in October 2018.

Development

The beginning of the An-148 project dates to the early 1990s, when work on the Antonov An-74 passenger modification started, headed by Petro Balabuev. In 2001, the project was renamed An-148. The An-74 fuselage was extended and the new aircraft's wing design was created from scratch. The developers initially used Motor Sich D-436-148 engines.

In 2002, production of the first three prototypes was begun at AVIANT. On 17 December 2004, the first prototype completed its maiden flight. The second prototype joined the testing programme in April 2005. During the certification programme, the two prototypes performed about 600 flights in total. On 26 February 2007, the aircraft, its D-436-148 engine and the AI-450-МS auxiliary power unit were certified by the Interstate Aviation Committee of Russia and the State Aviation Administration of Ukraine.

The An-148 is manufactured by the Ukrainian Kyiv AVIANT plant (now Antonov Serial Production Plant) and Russia's Voronezh Aircraft Production Association (VASO). On 28 June 2009, the first serially produced An-148, manufactured at VASO in Voronezh, took to the skies. Although numerous companies are involved in the project, at least 70% of the aircraft's hardware is made by Russian manufacturers. The An-148's list price is about $24–30 million. The main problem with the project has been increasing the aircraft's sluggish production rate. The then-independent AVIANT plant initially failed to satisfy to growing orders, leading to VASO's growing involvement in the aircraft's assembly. VASO announced in June 2017 that the two final Russian-assembled An-148s would be delivered, and the project would not see further development.

An "E" variant is also planned to offer a special  range, which would serve as a platform for the "E1", capable of non-stop Moscow-Vladivostok  services carrying 44 passengers.

Design

The An-148 aircraft is a high-wing monoplane with two turbofan jet engines mounted in pods under the wing. This arrangement protects the engines and wing structure against foreign object damage. A built-in autodiagnosis system, auxiliary power unit, and the wing configuration allow the An-148 to be used at poorly equipped airfields. Flight and navigation equipment features five  liquid crystal display panels built by Russia's Aviapribor and a fly-by-wire system, which enables the An-148 aircraft to operate day and night, under instrument flight rules and visual flight rules weather conditions on high-density air routes. Similar to the Boeing 737, the main landing gear rotates into the belly of the aircraft when in flight, with partial doors covering the legs, and the sides of the tires remaining exposed. Built-in entrance stairs enable boarding and disembarking the aircraft without extra ground equipment. The manufacturer claims high fuel efficiency of the Motor Sich D-436-148 engines.

The An-148-100 regional aircraft is the main model of the An-148. The aircraft is also configurable in a multiple-class layout which can carry fewer passengers, typically with four abreast business class.

Variants

An-148-100Amain version of the An-148. It has a passenger capacity of 85 in a one-class dense configuration or 68 in a two-class configuration, and a range of 
An-148-100Bextended-range version, up to 
An-148-200unified with An-158 by the rear part of the fuselage. Hence maximum seating capacity is increased to 89 passengers in dense configuration, comparing to 85 for An-148-100. Planned for production in Kyiv with An-158.
An-148-300previously called An-168, business variant, seating 8-40 passengers, with a range up to 
An-148DRLVproposed airborne early warning and control variant.
An-158stretched fuselage version for 99 passengers in a one-class standard configuration. Other changes include the installation of wingtip fences. The airplane successfully completed its first flight on 28 April 2010, with flight certification tests planned to be completed before the end of 2010; on 3 March 2011, it was given Russian certification. Nowadays, after flight and land test in night lands airports of Ecuador (Latacunga / Cotopaxi International Airport, 2806 m AMSL) and Bolivia (La Paz / El Alto International Airport, 4061 m AMSL) in November 2013 prepare documentation for obtaining correspondent supplements to the type certificate of this airplane.
The wing outer panels (including winglets), front fuselage with cockpit and nosewheel leg come from the An-158. The cargo hold is slightly enlarged, and there is an extra pair of main-wheels on each side. The An-178 was previously known as the An-148T, which would have had the Progress AI-727 turbofan as a potential power plant option.
HESA IrAn-148Designation of An-148 aircraft proposed for license production from knocked down kits in Iran.

Operational history
In April 2005, the Ilyushin Finance Leasing Company ordered the first series of An-148 for the Krasair airline. Lease agreement calls for ten aircraft with an option for five units valued at $270 million.

On 2 June 2009, the first An-148 entered commercial service with the Ukrainian carrier Aerosvit. The first passenger flight was from Kharkiv to Kyiv; the aircraft had the civilian registration UR-NTA. By November 2009, Aerosvit was operating the An-148 on the Kyiv–Odessa and Simferopol–Lviv routes, performing two flights a day with the average flight time of 4–5 hours.

On 21 December 2009, the An-148 was put into service in Russia with Rossiya airline. The first passenger flight was FV135 from Pulkovo Airport in Saint Petersburg to Sheremetyevo International Airport in Moscow. By 20 May 2010, Rossiya's An-148 fleet had accumulated a total of 915 flight hours and performed 710 landings. Rossiya complained that the aircraft experienced some reliability problems. There were some technical problems with the aircraft, and pilot training could not be ramped up fast enough, leading to pilot shortages. However, by 2011 the situation had improved.

On 15 February 2010, the An-148 started international flights to the European Union (Poland) with the Aerosvit airline.

On 18 April 2013, the first serial An-158 version was delivered to the Cuban flagship airline Cubana de Aviación. According to Antonov, Cubana additionally ordered two more aircraft, while other sources report this order to be for ten aircraft.
On 28 April 2013, Ukraine's Antonov aircraft maker handed over a third An-158 passenger airliner to Cuba and signed a contract for the delivery of three more.

In April 2016, Indian company Reliance defense limited and Antonov entered into an agreement to construct an aircraft based on An 148/ An 158 for defense and commercial purposes.

In April 2017, Cubana de Aviación suspended its flights between Havana and Guantánamo due to "technical problems" with its An-158 fleet. The route from Havana to Holguín also had problems: of 116 planned flights in the first months of 2017, 38 were cancelled and 36 suffered significant delays. Yoanka Acosta, head of Cubana's commercial division, explained that the planes were leased from Ukraine but spare parts were sourced from Russia, so the state of conflict between the two countries had affected the supply of parts, making maintenance difficult. In late April, however, representatives from Antonov and Cubana met and signed a service agreement that extended the aircraft's navigation directives to 3,600 flights and guaranteed the supply of spare parts, although it did not specify a date for normalization.

In March 2018 Rostransnadzor suspended all flights of An-148 in Russia after crash on 11 February 2018.

In May 2018, Cubana de Aviación grounded its An-158 fleet after it received an order from the Cuban National Aviation Authority. The official reason given by the Cuban National Aviation Authority was "multiple and repeating failures have been found in complex systems, built by mechanical, hydraulic and electrical components, as well as computer performance algorithms", in addition to "evidence of design and manufacturing flaws, serious issues in flight control system, cracks in the structure and engine temperature increase above normal parameters".

Orders and deliveries
The following sheet depicts all known orders and deliveries of An-148 aircraft. However it is unclear if all of them are currently operational:

Incidents and accidents
 On 5 March 2011, an Antonov An-148 (assembled by VASO) carrying test registration 61708 crashed during a test flight in Russia's Belgorod Oblast after an inflight breakup, killing all six crew members on board. An investigation commission found that the crew permitted the aircraft to accelerate more than 60 knots above its "Never Exceed" speed in an emergency descent, which led to the inflight breakup. Witnesses on the ground reported a wing had separated from the aircraft in flight. The aircraft was due to be delivered to Myanmar.

 On 11 February 2018, an Antonov An-148 operating as Saratov Airlines Flight 703, crashed shortly after takeoff near Ramenskoye, outside of Moscow. The aircraft was carrying 65 passengers and six crew members. There were no survivors. This is the first fatal commercial accident for this aircraft type.

Specifications

See also

References

External links

 Antonov An-148 page on the Antonov website
 Antonov An-158 page on the Antonov website
 Promotional video of the An-148 by Antonov
 3D-model Antonov ASTC. An-148 twin jet airliner for the ″3D Buildings″ layer inside Google Earth
 3D-model  An-148 jet aircraft take off, Kyiv for the ″3D Buildings″ layer inside Google Earth

An-148
2000s Ukrainian airliners
Twinjets
T-tail aircraft
High-wing aircraft
Aircraft first flown in 2004